Dog Age is a Norwegian rock band established in 1987. They are currently signed to the Norwegian record company VME, after a short, intermittent spell with Rainbow Quartz Records.
Their musical style is probably best described as psychedelia or psychedelic pop, but there are also elements of folk rock and progressive rock. Especially from the early seventies.

Group members are (as of October 2013):
Jon Anders Strand; lead & backing vocals, guitars.
Harald Beckstrøm; lead & backing vocals, guitars, bass.
Lars Fredrik Beckstrøm; lead & backing vocals, bass, guitars.
Jørn Smedslund; lead & backing vocals.
Øystein Jevanord; drums and percussion.
Eystein Hopland, keyboards.

Discography
Good Day (LP 1989)
Outdated Yeah (7-inch EP/Single «Freda's Married», 1990)
Sigh No More (LP, 1991)
Harm Last Train compilation CD (1994)
Makes You Wonder on Hi Jack! (LP, 1995)
Puddle (7-inch EP 1996)
Two LPs on One CD (Good Day + Sigh No More, CD 1997)
As It Were (CD 1998)
When the Fish Are Down (CD 2002)
Reefy Seadragon (CD 2006)
On the Garish Isles (CD 2011)
Swanlake Gate (CD 2015)

External links
Dog Age's official home page

Norwegian psychedelic rock music groups